Zhou Cong (born February 1, 1989) is a Chinese swimmer. He won a gold medal at the Men's 100 metre backstroke S8 event at the 2016 Summer Paralympics with a world record and paralympic record of 1:02.90. He also won another gold medal at the Men's 4 × 100m Medley Relay - 34 Points event, with a personal time of 1:03.08 and a total team time of 4:06.44, a paralympic record.

References

Living people
Swimmers at the 2016 Summer Paralympics
Medalists at the 2016 Summer Paralympics
Paralympic gold medalists for China
Paralympic swimmers of China
Chinese male backstroke swimmers
S8-classified Paralympic swimmers
1989 births
Paralympic medalists in swimming
21st-century Chinese people